Closeout or close-out may refer to:

 Close-out (aerospace)
 Closeout (sale)
 Closeout (surfing)
 Closeout, a basketball defensive technique
 Closeout, a kind of match fixing in martial arts